Jung Min-ah (born March 3, 1994) is a South Korean actress. She began her career as a child actress, starring in television dramas such as Damo (2003), Fashion 70's (2005) and Time Between Dog and Wolf (2007).

Filmography

Television series

Film

Awards and nominations

References

External links 
 
 
 
 
 

1994 births
Living people
South Korean child actresses
South Korean television actresses
South Korean film actresses